Louis Albert Johnson  (27 September 1924 Feilding, New Zealand – 1 November 1988) was a New Zealand poet.

Life
He graduated from Wellington Teachers’ Training College.
From 1968 to 1980, Johnson lived overseas and traveled widely, with an extended stay in Papua New Guinea.

Johnson worked as a schoolteacher, journalist, and editor of several publications, including the New Zealand Poetry Yearbook (1951–64), Numbers (1954–60), and Antipodes New Writing (1987).

Awards
 1975 New Zealand Book Award for poetry for Fires and Patterns
 1976 Montana New Zealand Book Award for Poetry

Works
"City Sunday"; "Holidays"; "Kapiti Coast", New Zealand Electronic Poetry Center
 Stanza and Scene (1945)
 Roughshod Among the Lilies, (1951)
 The Sun Among the Ruins (1951)
 New Worlds for Old (1957).
 
 
 Onion (1972)
 
 Winter Apples (1984)

Criticism
"Starveling Year, poems by Mary Stanley", new zealand electronic poetry centre

References

External links
"Louis Johnson", New Zealand Literature File, University of Auckland
"Australia and New Zealand", Poetry House

1924 births
1988 deaths
New Zealand male poets
20th-century New Zealand poets
20th-century New Zealand male writers